Georg Christian Füchsel (born 14 February 1722 in Ilmenau, Saxe-Weimar – died 20 June 1773 in Rudolstadt, Thuringia) was a German physician and geologist.

The works of Füchsel and Johann Gottlob Lehmann led to advances in stratigraphy.

References

1722 births
1773 deaths
People from Ilmenau
People from Saxe-Weimar
18th-century German physicians
18th-century German geologists